Sierra Pandura, also known as Cuchilla de Pandura (Pandura Ridge) and La Pica, is a mountain range that runs from the Sierra de Cayey in the northwest to the Caribbean Sea in the southeast in southeastern Puerto Rico, between the municipalities of Maunabo and Yabucoa. Together with the Sierra de Guardarraya to the south, Sierra Pandura is part of the San Lorinzo batholith physiological region, a composite body of volcanic origin which bifurcates the mountain ridge.

Sierra Pandura Protected Natural Area 

The western portion of Sierra Pandura is protected by the Puerto Rico Conservation Trust as the Sierra Pandura Protected Natural Area (Spanish: Área natural protegida de Sierra Pandura). This protected natural area is one of the last habitats of the rare, endemic and endangered Puerto Rican rock frog (Eleutherodactylus cooki) also known as the rock coqui or the coquí guajón in Spanish. This small species of frog dwells primarily in crevices and grottos (habitats which are locally known as guajonales) of the Sierra Pandura.

The United States Fish and Wildlife Service published a recovery plan for the species that designates a critical habitat of approximately  within some surrounding areas on September 24, 2004, the. Due to the limited distribution of the species, specialized habitat uses and the many threats; the Conservation Trust of Puerto Rico intends to permanently protect guajón habitats and the corridors found between existing populations.

See also 
 Protected areas of Puerto Rico
 Sierra de Guardarraya

References 

Mountain ranges of Puerto Rico
Protected areas of Puerto Rico
Maunabo, Puerto Rico
Yabucoa, Puerto Rico